The Battle of Verona was fought on 30 September 489 between the Ostrogothic leader Theodoric the Great and the Germanic King of Italy Odoacer. Theodoric personally led his troops in battle, and achieved a decisive victory. Odoacer was subsequently forced to flee to Ravenna, and Theodoric was free to capture Pavia and Milan.

References

Verona 489
Verona 489
Verona 489
Verona
Ostrogothic Kingdom
489
5th century in Italy
History of Verona
Theoderic the Great